Huang Zhihong; born May 7, 1965 in Lanxi, Jinhua, Zhejiang) is a former shot put athlete from China. An Olympic silver medallist and a double world champion, she was in fact the first Asian to win a world championship in athletics. Her personal best throw is 21.52, achieved in Beijing 1990.

Achievements

See also
 China at the World Championships in Athletics

References

External
 
 
 

1965 births
Living people
People from Jinhua
Athletes from Zhejiang
Chinese female shot putters
Olympic athletes of China
Olympic silver medalists for China
Athletes (track and field) at the 1988 Summer Olympics
Athletes (track and field) at the 1992 Summer Olympics
Athletes (track and field) at the 1996 Summer Olympics
Asian Games gold medalists for China
Asian Games silver medalists for China
Asian Games medalists in athletics (track and field)
Athletes (track and field) at the 1986 Asian Games
Athletes (track and field) at the 1990 Asian Games
World Athletics Championships athletes for China
World Athletics Championships medalists
Olympic silver medalists in athletics (track and field)
Universiade medalists in athletics (track and field)
Goodwill Games medalists in athletics
Medalists at the 1986 Asian Games
Medalists at the 1990 Asian Games
Universiade gold medalists for China
World Athletics Indoor Championships medalists
World Athletics Championships winners
Medalists at the 1992 Summer Olympics
Medalists at the 1989 Summer Universiade
Competitors at the 1990 Goodwill Games
Competitors at the 1994 Goodwill Games
20th-century Chinese women